Stigmella atricapitella is a moth of the family Nepticulidae. It is found from Scandinavia to Ireland, the Iberian Peninsula, Sicily, Greece and Ukraine. It is also present in the Near East. It also occurs on Madeira, where it is most likely an introduced species.

The head is black, ferruginous to orange, or sometimes mixed, collar often whitish. Antennal eyecaps white. Forewings rather shining bronze, apex suffused with purple. Hindwings grey.
Adults are on wing from May to June and again from July to August. There are two generations per year.

The larvae feed on Quercus cerris, Quercus petraea, Quercus pubescens, Quercus pyrenaica and Quercus robur. They mine the leaves of their host plant. The mine consists of a short and broad corridor.

References

External links
bladmineerders.nl
Fauna Europaea
Swedish moths
 Stigmella atricapitella images at  Consortium for the Barcode of Life
The Quercus Feeding Stigmella Species Of The West Palaearctic: New Species, Key And Distribution (Lepidoptera: Nepticulidae)

Nepticulidae
Moths of Europe
Moths of Asia
Moths described in 1828